Lime Stardom is a residential and commercial building located at 1 Larch Street, Tai Kok Tsui, Yau Tsim Mong District, Kowloon, Hong Kong. It was developed by Sun Hung Kai Properties and the Urban Renewal Authority.

The development has been described as a "boutique apartment". It also contains a shopping arcade.

References

External links

 Official Website
 Lime Stardom -- boutique apartment in Mong Kok

Tai Kok Tsui
Private housing estates in Hong Kong